Hultsfred Airport is a regional airport in Hultsfred Municipality, Sweden, about 5 km north of the town of Hultsfred. Currently there is no scheduled traffic to/from the airport. It is however used by a local aviation club. A scheduled line to Stockholm existed for many years but was closed down in 2006.

Statistics

See also
 List of the largest airports in the Nordic countries

Airports in Sweden